Crematogaster boliviana is a species of ant in tribe Crematogastrini. It was described by Wheeler in 1922.

References

boliviana
Insects described in 1922